Hettiarachchige Emanuel Aloysius Rodrigo (1933–17 March 1997), better known as Prem Jayanth, was an actor in Sri Lankan cinema as well as a producer and art director. Considered as the first male superstar in Sinhala cinema, Jayanth rose to prominence with starring roles in the popular films Sujatha (1953) and Seda Sulang (1955).

Personal life

Jayanth was born in Layards Broadway, Grandpass and attended Joseph’s College, Grandpass and St. Lucia's College Colombo 13.

Jayanth married actress Nanda Leelanayake sometime in the 1960s and had seven children, two boys - Jagath and Janith - and five girls - Sunila, Sandhya, Anusha, Nirma and Shiroma. His son, Jagath Rohan appeared in few film including 1980 film Sabeetha. 

Jayanth died on 17 March 1997 at the age of 64. Nanda died on 26 September 2014 at the age of 84.

Cinema career
He entered the school stage. In 1932, he first joined the public stage through the stage drama Carnival produced by A. D. J. Mathupala.

Jayanth began his film career with a small role in 1952 film Unmathu Wishwasaya directed by B. A. W. Jayamanne. His breakthrough came when he was cast in the lead male role on 1953 film Sujatha opposite Florida Jayalath. The film became a big hit and established Jayanth and Jayalath as major stars. They reappeared together in the 1955 film Seda Sulang which was also popular featuring the only songs sung by Lata Mangeshkar for a Sri Lankan film. Jayanth had a major role in Warada Kageda in 1953.

Jayanth subsequently acted in Awishwasaya, Purusha Rathnaya (1959) and  Sithaka Mahima (1964) before reuniting with Jaylath in her directorial effort Sweep Ticket (1965). In 1967 he portrayed a role in Sarana directed by Ashoka David. He quit from acting after the film Sarana.

Jayanth started his company Seven Arts around 1972 and produced such films as Sahanaya (1972), Hondata Hondai (1973), Kawda Raja (1976), Sabeetha (1980), Senasuma (1981) and Mala Giravi (1984). He was also active as a designer of film cutouts and was the art director of Wahal Doopatha (1968) and Deviyani Oba Kohida (1977).

Filmography

References

1933 births
1997 deaths
Sri Lankan male film actors
Sinhalese male actors
20th-century Sri Lankan male actors